Catherine Anderson (born 22 December 1948 in Grants Pass, Oregon, USA), is an American best-selling writer of historical and contemporary romance novels since 1988.

Biography
Adeline Catherine was born on 22 December 1948 in Grants Pass, Oregon, USA, daughter of Benjamin Early La May, a chef. Her mother was a writer, and some of her earliest memories are of hearing her mother type stories on an old typewriter, and then read the finished work aloud.  With this inspiration, she began writing her own stories as a child. Feeling that a career as a published writer was out of reach, however, she decided to major in accounting when she attended college so that she could help her husband, Sidney D. Anderson, keep the books at his company. After realizing that numbers did not make her happy, and with her husband's full blessing, Anderson dropped out of college so that she could pursue a writing career.

Catherine Anderson's first four published books were category romance, under the Harlequin Intrigue romantic suspense line.  Her subsequent single-title works have alternated between contemporary and historical romances.  Many of her novels feature a character with a disability, be it physical or mental, and show the reader how those disabilities can be overcome.  Animals are also a recurrent theme in her stories, with many books set on or near ranches.  Romantic Times Magazine describes her novels as "moving, heartwarming,...celebrat[ing] the ideals of perfect love in an imperfect world.  Her characters are complex, often conflicted individuals who triumph over substantial odds."  Reader acclaims describe her books as funny, delightful, heartwrenching, beautiful, superb, and of classic proportions.

They have two grown sons,  Sidney D. Anderson, Jr. and John G. Anderson. The pair love the wildlife on their pristine mountain ridge and greatly enjoy the solitude of their wilderness lifestyle, which is, Anderson says, a writer's dream. Their estate, heavily guarded by electronic surveillance, is off limits to hunters, providing all wild creatures sanctuary. Their three dogs are allowed to run at large on the property.

In May 2008, Anderson's Comanche Moon was reissued and placed on the  New York Times bestseller list.

Reception
Her later novels, including Sun Kissed and Morning Light have reached the top 5 and 10 of the New York Times Bestseller List.  She has been nominated nine times for Romantic Times Reviewers' Choice Awards, her book Cherish was a Romantic Times award winner, and she has also been awarded one of their Career Achievement Awards.

Bibliography

Historical Novels
Coming up Roses, 1993	
Cheyenne Amber, 1994
Annie's Song, 1996
Simply Love, 1997
Cherish, 1998
Walking on Air, 2014

Harlequin Intrigue
Reasonable Doubt, 1988	
Without a Trace, 1989
Switchback, 1990	
Cry of the Wild, 1992

Contemporary Romance
Forever After, 1998
Seventh Heaven, 2000
Always in My Heart, 2002
Only By Your Touch, 2003
The Christmas Room, 2017

The Comanche Series
Comanche Moon, 1991
Comanche Heart, 1991
Indigo Blue, 1992	
Comanche Magic, 1994

Keegan-Paxton Family Series
Keegan's Lady, 1996
"Beautiful Gifts" in The True Love Wedding Dress, 2005
Summer Breeze, 2006
Early Dawn, 2010
Lucky Penny, 2012

Kendrick/Coulter/Harrigan Series
Baby Love, 1999
Phantom Waltz, 2001
Sweet Nothings, 2002
Blue Skies,, 2004
Bright Eyes, 2004	
My Sunshine, 2005
Sun Kissed, 2007
Morning Light, 2008
Star Bright, 2009
Here to Stay, 2011
Perfect Timing, 2013

Mystic Creek Series
Silver Thaw, 2015
New Leaf, 2016
Mulberry Moon, 2017
Spring Forward, 2018
Strawberry Hill, 2018
Huckleberry Lake, 2019
Maple Leaf Harvest, 2021

Anthologies
"Shotgun Bride" in Tall, Dark, and Dangerous, 1994	
"Fancy Free" in Three Weddings and a Kiss and in Three Times a Bride, 1995
"Beautiful Gifts" in The True Love Wedding Dress, 2005
"Autumn Treasures" in Cast of Characters, 2012

See also

List of romantic novelists

References and sources

External links
Catherine Anderson Official Site

1948 births
Living people
American romantic fiction writers